These are the official results of the Women's Javelin Throw event at the 1991 World Championships in Tokyo, Japan. There were a total of 31 participating athletes, with the final held on Sunday September 1, 1991. All results were made with a rough surfaced javelin.

Medalists

Schedule
All times are Japan Standard Time (UTC+9)

Abbreviations
All results shown are in metres

Records

Qualification
 Held on Saturday 1991-08-31

Final

See also
 1988 Women's Olympic Javelin Throw (Seoul)
 1990 Women's European Championships Javelin Throw (Split)
 1992 Women's Olympic Javelin Throw (Barcelona)
 1994 Women's European Championships Javelin Throw (Helsinki)

References
 Results

J
Javelin throw at the World Athletics Championships
1991 in women's athletics